Epicac or EPICAC may refer to:

 EPICAC (short story), by Kurt Vonnegut
 Syrup of ipecac, emetic substance often used to induce vomiting